Boskamp may refer to:

 Boskamp, Suriname, a town in Saramacca District
 Boskamp, Overijssel, a village in the municipality of Olst-Wijhe, Netherlands
 SV Boskamp,  a Surinamese football club

People with the surname Boskamp
Hans Boskamp (1932–2011), Dutch footballer
Johan Boskamp (born 1948), Dutch footballer